The Shadow Ministry of Matthew Guy was the Coalition opposition, opposing the Andrews government in the Parliament of Victoria, Australia. Matthew Guy held the position of opposition leader twice, first from 4 December 2014 until 6 December 2018, following his loss in the 2018 Victorian state election, and then again from 7 September 2021 until 8 December 2022 when he defeated his successor, Michael O'Brien in a leadership spill. The shadow cabinet was made up of the caucuses from the Liberal Party and Nationals.

The shadow ministry was replaced by the shadow ministry of John Pesutto after Pesutto succeeded Guy as Liberal Party leader in December 2022.

Second term

Final arrangement
A reshuffle of the shadow ministry was announced on 25 February 2022, with the reinstatement of former Leader of the Opposition Michael O'Brien to the frontbench. He was appointed to role of the shadow attorney-general, replacing Matthew Bach.

Second arrangement
In October 2021, Tim Smith resigned from the shadow cabinet after he crashed his car while driving under the influence of alcohol. Shadow children and students minister Matthew Bach and shadow treasurer David Davis replaced Smith as shadow attorney-general and shadow finance minister respectively.

Only the portfolios held by Bach and Davis are shown below.

First arrangement
Guy unveiled his shadow ministry for his second term as opposition leader on 12 September 2021.

See also 

 Second Andrews Ministry
 Opposition (Victoria)
 2018 Victorian state election
 2022 Victorian state election

References

External links 
 List of Current Shadow Ministers (Parliament of Victoria)
 

Victoria shadow ministries
Politics of Victoria (Australia)